Monsters vs. Aliens is an American computer-animated television series based on the 2009 DreamWorks Animation film of the same name. First announced in 2009, the series premiered on Nickelodeon on March 23, 2013, after the Nickelodeon Kids' Choice Awards, then began airing in its regular timeslot on April 6, 2013. A total of 26 episodes consisting of 50 segments were released, with the last episode airing on February 8, 2014. Following this, the series was not renewed for a second season. Executive producer Bob Schooley said its cancellation was due to low ratings, as well as the network's plans to refocus on "the more Nickish shows".

Synopsis
Brainless blob B.O.B., prehistoric fish-man Link, mad scientist Dr. Cockroach and incredible growing woman Ginormica learn to adapt to a new world as they work alongside a bizarre group of aliens at Area Fifty-Something, a secret underground base.

Cast

Main
 Riki Lindhome as Susan Murphy/Ginormica
 Eric Edelstein as B.O.B.
 Chris O'Dowd as Dr. Cockroach
 Diedrich Bader as the Missing Link
 James Patrick Stuart as President Hathaway
 Jeff Bennett as Coverton
 Gillian Jacobs as Sta'abi

Additional voices 
 Dee Bradley Baker as Zombie Moon Ape
 Jane Carr as Miss Klangpopper
 Lucas Cruikshank as Smarty
 Robin Atkin Downes as Academic Dr. Cockroach, Party Dr. Cockroach
 Will Friedle as Man-Beast
 Josh Gad as Internet
 Nolan North as Derek Dietl
 Kevin Michael Richardson as General Warren Monger
 Joey Richter as Jace Lovins
 Amy Sedaris as Dr. Cutter
 Fred Tatasciore as Vornicarn
 Haley Tju as Sqweep
 James Urbaniak as Rule-Bot
 Kari Wahlgren as Baby President

Production
In 2009, Jeffrey Katzenberg announced that Nickelodeon had ordered a pilot for a Monsters vs. Aliens cartoon series. Eventually, the series was announced at the 2012 annual Nickelodeon upfront, being green-lit for 26 episodes. The cast features new voice actors for the characters of Dr. Cockroach (Chris O'Dowd), Susan (Riki Lindhome), Link (Diedrich Bader), and B.O.B. (Eric Edelstein). The series was partly produced by New Zealand CG animation studio Oktobor Animation, similar to the other DreamWorks-based series The Penguins of Madagascar and Kung Fu Panda: Legends of Awesomeness. The executive producers of Monsters vs. Aliens (Bob Schooley, Mark McCorkle, and Brett Haaland) all previously worked on Penguins.

Cancellation
In November 2013, executive producer Bob Schooley announced on Twitter that Monsters vs. Aliens would not be renewed for a second season due to low ratings and the network's desire to "get back to the more Nickish shows".

Episodes

Region 1 DVDs 
20th Century Fox Home Entertainment was the DVD distributor for the series.

Region 2 DVDs

Main Series

Awards and nominations

References

External links

 

2010s American animated television series
2010s American comic science fiction television series
2013 American television series debuts
2014 American television series endings
2010s Nickelodeon original programming
American computer-animated television series
Television series by DreamWorks Animation
Animated television shows based on films
Nicktoons
American children's animated comic science fiction television series
English-language television shows
Monsters vs. Aliens (franchise)
Animated television series about extraterrestrial life
Animated television series about monsters